Inverness is a rural locality in the Livingstone Shire, Queensland, in Northeast Australia.

References 

Shire of Livingstone
Localities in Queensland